The Panavia Tornado is a family of twin-engine, variable-sweep wing multirole combat aircraft, jointly developed and manufactured by Italy, the United Kingdom and West Germany. There are three primary Tornado variants: the Tornado IDS (interdictor/strike) fighter-bomber, the Tornado ECR (electronic combat/reconnaissance) SEAD aircraft and the Tornado ADV (air defence variant) interceptor aircraft.

The Tornado was developed and built by Panavia Aircraft GmbH, a tri-national consortium consisting of British Aerospace (previously British Aircraft Corporation), MBB of West Germany, and Aeritalia of Italy. It first flew on 14 August 1974 and was introduced into service in 1979–1980. Due to its multirole design, it was able to replace several different fleets of aircraft in the adopting air forces. The Royal Saudi Air Force (RSAF) became the only export operator of the Tornado in addition to the three original partner nations. A tri-nation training and evaluation unit operating from RAF Cottesmore, the Tri-National Tornado Training Establishment, maintained a level of international co-operation beyond the production stage.

The Tornado was operated by the Royal Air Force (RAF), Italian Air Force, and RSAF during the Gulf War of 1991, in which the Tornado conducted many low-altitude penetrating strike missions. The Tornados of various services were also used in the Bosnian War, Kosovo War, Iraq War, in Libya during the 2011 Libyan civil war, as well as smaller roles in Afghanistan, Yemen, and Syria. Including all variants, 990 aircraft were built.

Development

Origins

During the 1960s, aeronautical designers looked to variable-geometry wing designs to gain the manoeuvrability and efficient cruise of straight wings with the speed of swept wing designs. The United Kingdom had cancelled the procurement of the TSR-2 and subsequent F-111K aircraft, and was still looking for a replacement for its Avro Vulcan and Blackburn Buccaneer strike aircraft. Britain and France had initiated the BAC/Dassault AFVG (Anglo French Variable Geometry) project in 1965, but this had ended with French withdrawal in 1967. Britain continued to develop a variable-geometry aircraft similar to the proposed AFVG, and sought new partners to achieve this. West German EWR with Boeing then with Fairchild-Hiller and Republic Aviation had been developing design studies of the swing-wing EWR-Fairchild-Hiller A400 AVS Advanced Vertical Strike (which has a similar configuration to the Tornado) from 1964 to 1968

In 1968, West Germany, the Netherlands, Belgium, Italy and Canada formed a working group to examine replacements for the Lockheed F-104 Starfighter, initially called the Multi Role Aircraft (MRA), later renamed as the Multi Role Combat Aircraft (MRCA). As the partner nations' requirements were so diverse, it was decided to develop a single aircraft that could perform a variety of missions that were previously undertaken by a fleet of different aircraft. Britain joined the MRCA group in 1968, represented by Air Vice-Marshal Michael Giddings, and a memorandum of agreement was drafted between Britain, West Germany, and Italy in May 1969.

By the end of 1968, the prospective purchases from the six countries amounted to 1,500 aircraft. Canada and Belgium had departed before any long-term commitments had been made to the programme; Canada had found the project politically unpalatable; there was a perception in political circles that much of the manufacturing and specifications were focused on Western Europe. France had made a favourable offer to Belgium on the Dassault Mirage 5.

Panavia Aircraft GmbH

On 26 March 1969, four partner nations – United Kingdom, Germany, Italy and the Netherlands, agreed to form a multinational company, Panavia Aircraft GmbH, to develop and manufacture the MRCA. The project's aim was to produce an aircraft capable of undertaking missions in the tactical strike, reconnaissance, air defence, and maritime roles. Various concepts, including alternative fixed-wing and single-engine designs, were studied while defining the aircraft. The Netherlands pulled out of the project in 1970, citing that the aircraft was too complicated and technical for the RNLAF's preferences, which had sought a simpler aircraft with outstanding manoeuvrability. An additional blow was struck when the German requirement reduced from an initial 600 aircraft to 324 in 1972. It has been suggested that Germany deliberately placed an unrealistically high initial order to secure the company headquarters and initial test flight in Germany rather than the UK, so as to have a bigger design influence.

When the agreement was finalised, the United Kingdom and West Germany each had a 42.5% stake of the workload, with the remaining 15% going to Italy; this division of the production work was heavily influenced by international political bargaining. The front fuselage and tail assembly was assigned to BAC (now BAE Systems) in the United Kingdom; the centre fuselage to MBB (now part of Airbus) in West Germany; and the wings to Aeritalia (now Leonardo) in Italy. Similarly, tri-national worksharing was used for engines and equipment. A separate multinational company, Turbo-Union, was formed in June 1970 to develop and build the RB199 engines for the aircraft, with ownership split 40% Rolls-Royce, 40% MTU, and 20% FIAT.

At the conclusion of the project definition phase in May 1970, the concepts were reduced to two designs; a single seat Panavia 100 which West Germany initially preferred, and the twin-seat Panavia 200 which the RAF preferred. The aircraft was briefly called the Panavia Panther, and the project soon coalesced towards the two-seat option. In September 1971, the three governments signed an Intention to Proceed (ITP) document, at which point the aircraft was intended solely for the low-level strike mission, where it was viewed as a viable threat to Soviet defences in that role. It was at this point that Britain's Chief of the Defence Staff announced "two-thirds of the fighting front line will be composed of this single, basic aircraft type".

Prototypes and testing
The first of fifteen development aircraft (nine prototypes, P01 to P09, and six pre-series, PS11 to PS 16) flew on 14 August 1974 at Manching, Germany; the pilot, Paul Millett described his experience: "Aircraft handling was delightful... the actual flight went so smoothly that I did begin to wonder whether this was not yet another simulation". Flight testing led to the need for minor modifications. Airflow disturbances were responded to by re-profiling the engine intakes and the fuselage to minimise surging and buffeting at supersonic speeds.

According to Jim Quinn, programmer of the Tornado development simulation software and engineer on the Tornado engine and engine controls, the prototype was safely capable of reaching supercruise, but the engines had severe safety issues at high altitude while trying to decelerate. At high altitude and low turbine speed the compressor did not provide enough pressure to hold back the combustion pressure and would result in a violent vibration as the combustion pressure backfired into the intake. To avoid this effect the engine controls would automatically increase the minimum idle setting as altitude increased, until at very high altitudes the idle setting was so high, however, that it was close to maximum dry thrust. This resulted in one of the test aircraft being stuck in a mach 1.2 supercruise at high altitude and having to reduce speed by turning the aircraft, because the idle setting at that altitude was so high that the aircraft could not decelerate.

The British Ministry of Supply assigned Chief Engineer Ted Talbot from the Concorde development team to provide intake design assistance to the Tornado development team in order to overcome these issues, which they hesitantly agreed to after noting that the Concorde intake data had apparently already been leaked to the Soviet Union. The German engineers working on the Tornado intake were unable to produce a functional Concorde style intake despite having data from the Concorde team. To make the problem worse, their management team incorrectly filed a patent on the Concorde design, and then tried to sue the British engineers who had provided the design to them. The German lawyers realised that the British had provided the designs to the German team, and requested further information to help their engineers overcome the problems with the Tornado intake, but Chief Engineer Talbot refused. According to Talbot, the Concorde engineers had determined the issue with the Tornado intake was that the engine did not respond to unexpected changes in the intake position, and therefore the engine was running at the wrong setting for a given position of the intake ramps. This was because the Concorde had similar issues due to control pressure not being high enough to maintain proper angles of the intake ramps. Aerodynamic forces could force the intakes into the improper position, and so they should have the ability to control the engines if this occurs. The Tornado intake system did not allow for this. Due to the behaviour of the German management team, the British engineers declined to share this information, and so the Tornado was not equipped with the more advanced intake design of the Concorde.

Testing revealed that a nose-wheel steering augmentation system, connecting with the yaw damper, was necessary to counteract the destabilising effect produced by deploying the thrust reverser during the landing roll.

From 1967 until 1984 Soviet KGB agents were provided details on the Tornado by the head of the West German Messerschmitt-Bölkow-Blohm Planning department, Manfred Rotsch.

Two prototypes were lost in accidents, both of which had been primarily caused by poor piloting decisions and errors leading to two ground collision incidents; a third Tornado prototype was seriously damaged by an incident involving pilot-induced pitch oscillation. During the type's development, aircraft designers of the era were beginning to incorporate features such as more sophisticated stability augmentation systems and autopilots. Aircraft such as the Tornado and the General Dynamics F-16 Fighting Falcon made use of these new technologies. Failure testing of the Tornado's triplex analogue command and stability augmentation system (CSAS) was conducted on a series of realistic flight control rigs; the variable-sweep wings in combination with varying, and frequently very heavy, payloads complicated the clearance process.

Production

The contract for the Batch 1 aircraft was signed on 29 July 1976. The first flight of a production aircraft was on 10 July 1979 by ZA319 at BAe Warton. The first aircraft were delivered to the RAF and German Air Force on 5 and 6 June 1979 respectively. The first Italian Tornado was delivered on 25 September 1981. On 29 January 1981, the Tri-National Tornado Training Establishment (TTTE) officially opened at RAF Cottesmore, remaining active in training pilots from all operating nations until 31 March 1999. The 500th Tornado to be produced was delivered to West Germany on 19 December 1987.

Export customers were sought after West Germany withdrew its objections to exporting the aircraft; Saudi Arabia was the only export customer of the Tornado. The agreement to purchase the Tornado was part of the Al-Yamamah arms deal between British Aerospace and the Saudi government. Oman had committed to purchasing Tornados and the equipment to operate them for a total value of £250 million in the late 1980s, but cancelled the order in 1990 due to financial difficulties.

During the 1970s, Australia considered joining the MRCA programme to find a replacement for their ageing Dassault Mirage IIIs; ultimately the McDonnell Douglas F/A-18 Hornet was selected to meet the requirement. Canada similarly opted for the F/A-18 after considering the Tornado. Japan considered the Tornado in the 1980s, along with the F-16 and F/A-18, before selecting the Mitsubishi F-2. In the 1990s, both Taiwan and South Korea expressed interest in acquiring a small number of Tornado ECR aircraft. In 2001, EADS proposed a Tornado ECR variant with a greater electronic warfare capability for Australia.

Production came to an end in 1998; the last batch of aircraft produced going to the Royal Saudi Air Force, who had ordered a total of 96 IDS Tornados. In June 2011, it was announced that the Tornado fleet had flown collectively over one million flying hours. Aviation author Jon Lake noted that "The Trinational Panavia Consortium produced just short of 1,000 Tornados, making it one of the most successful postwar bomber programs". In 2008, AirForces Monthly said of the Tornado: "For more than a quarter of a century ... the most important military aircraft in Western Europe."

Design

Overview

The Panavia Tornado is a multirole, twin-engined aircraft designed to excel at low-level penetration of enemy defences. The mission envisaged during the Cold War was the delivery of conventional and nuclear ordnance on the invading forces of the Warsaw Pact countries of Eastern Europe; this dictated several significant features of the design. Variable wing geometry allowed for minimal drag during the low-level dash towards a well-prepared enemy. Advanced navigation and flight computers, including the then-innovative fly-by-wire system, greatly reduced the workload of the pilot during low-level flight and eased control of the aircraft. For long range missions, the Tornado has a retractable refuelling probe.

As a multirole aircraft, the Tornado is capable of undertaking more mission profiles than the anticipated strike mission; various operators replaced multiple aircraft types with the Tornado as a common type – the use of dedicated single role aircraft for specialist purposes such as battlefield reconnaissance, maritime patrol duties, or dedicated electronic countermeasures (ECM) were phased out – either by standard Tornados or modified variants, such as the Tornado ECR. The most extensive modification from the base Tornado design was the Tornado ADV, which was stretched and armed with long range anti-aircraft missiles to serve in the interceptor role.

Tornado operators have undertaken various life extension and upgrade programmes to keep their Tornado fleets as viable frontline aircraft. With these upgrades it is projected that the Tornado shall be in service until 2025, more than 50 years after the first prototype took flight.

Variable-sweep wing

In order for the Tornado to perform well as a low-level supersonic strike aircraft, it was considered necessary for it to possess good high-speed and low-speed flight characteristics. To achieve high-speed performance, a swept or delta wing is typically adopted, but these wing designs are inefficient at low speeds. To operate at both high and low speeds with great effectiveness, the Tornado uses a variable-sweep wing. This approach had been adopted by earlier aircraft, such as the American Grumman F-14 Tomcat, which is the most similar in mission flexibility.  The swing-wing was also shared by the older American General Dynamics F-111 Aardvark strike fighter, and the Soviet Mikoyan-Gurevich MiG-23 fighter. The smaller Tornado has many similarities with the F-111, however the Tornado differs in being a multi-role aircraft with more advanced onboard systems and avionics.

The level of wing sweep (i.e. the angle of the wings in relation to the fuselage) can be altered in flight at the pilot's control. The variable wing can adopt any sweep angle between 25 degrees and 67 degrees, with a corresponding speed range for each angle. Some Tornado ADVs were outfitted with an automatic wing-sweep system to reduce pilot workload. When the wings are swept back, the exposed wing area is lowered and drag is significantly decreased, which is conducive to performing high-speed low-level flight. The weapons pylons pivot with the angle of the variable-sweep wings so that the stores point in the direction of flight and do not hinder any wing positions.

In development, significant attention was given to the Tornado's short-field take-off and landing (STOL) performance. Germany, in particular, encouraged this design aspect. For shorter take-off and landing distances, the Tornado can sweep its wings forwards to the 25-degree position, and deploy its full-span flaps and leading edge slats to allow the aircraft to fly at slower speeds. These features, in combination with the thrust reverser-equipped engines, give the Tornado excellent low-speed handling and landing characteristics.

Avionics

The Tornado features a tandem-seat cockpit, crewed by a pilot and a navigator/weapons officer; both electromechanical and electro-optical controls are used to fly the aircraft and manage its systems. An array of dials and switches are mounted on either side of a centrally placed CRT monitor, controlling the navigational, communications, and weapons-control computers. BAE Systems developed the Tornado Advanced Radar Display Information System (TARDIS), a  multi-function display, to replace the rear cockpit's Combined Radar and Projected Map Display; the RAF began installing TARDIS on the GR4 fleet in 2004.

The primary flight controls of the Tornado are a fly-by-wire hybrid, consisting of an analogue quadruplex Command and Stability Augmentation System (CSAS) connected to a digital Autopilot & Flight Director System (AFDS). In addition a level of mechanical reversion capacity was retained to safeguard against potential failure. To enhance pilot awareness, artificial feel was built into the flight controls, such as the centrally located stick. Because the Tornado's variable wings enable the aircraft to drastically alter its flight envelope, the artificial responses adjust automatically to wing profile changes and other changes to flight attitude. As a large variety of munitions and stores can be outfitted, the resulting changes to the aircraft's flight dynamics are routinely compensated for by the flight stability system.

The Tornado incorporates a combined navigation/attack Doppler radar that simultaneously scans for targets and conducts fully automated terrain-following for low-level flight operations. Being able to conduct all-weather hands-off low-level flight was considered one of the core advantages of the Tornado. The Tornado ADV had a different radar system to other variants, designated AI.24 Foxhunter, as it is designed for air defence operations. The Tornado was one of the earliest aircraft to be fitted with a digital data bus for data transmission. A Link 16 JTIDS integration on the F3 variant enabled the exchange of radar and other sensory information with nearby friendly aircraft.

Some Tornado variants carry different avionics and equipment, depending on their mission. The Tornado ECR operated by Germany and Italy is devoted to Suppression of Enemy Air Defences (SEAD) missions. The Tornado ECR is equipped with an emitter-locator system (ELS) to detect radar use. German ECRs have a Honeywell infrared imaging system for reconnaissance flights. RAF and RSAF Tornados have the Laser Range Finder and Marked Target Seekers (LRMTS) for targeting laser-guided munitions. In 1991, the RAF introduced TIALD, allowing Tornado GR1s to laser-designate their own targets.

The GR1A and GR4A reconnaissance variants were equipped with TIRRS (Tornado Infrared Reconnaissance System), consisting of one SLIR (Sideways Looking Infra Red) sensor on each side of the fuselage forward of the engine intakes to capture oblique images, and a single IRLS (InfrarRed LineScan) sensor mounted on the fuselage's underside to provide vertical images. TIRRS recorded images on six S-VHS video tapes. The newer RAPTOR reconnaissance pod replaced the built-in TIRRS system.

Armament and equipment
The Tornado is cleared to carry the majority of air-launched weapons in the NATO inventory, including various unguided and laser-guided bombs, anti-ship and anti-radiation missiles, as well as specialised weapons such as anti-personnel mines and anti-runway munitions. To improve survivability in combat, the Tornado is equipped with onboard countermeasures, ranging from flare and chaff dispensers to electronic countermeasure pods that can be mounted under the wings. Underwing fuel tanks and a buddy store aerial refuelling system that allows one Tornado to refuel another are available to extend the aircraft's range.

In the decades since the Tornado's introduction, all of the Tornado operators have undertaken various upgrade and modification programmes to allow new weapons to be used by their squadrons. Amongst the armaments that the Tornado has been adapted to deploy are the Enhanced Paveway and Joint Direct Attack Munition bombs, and modern cruise missiles such as the Taurus and Storm Shadow missiles. These upgrades have increased the Tornado's capabilities and combat accuracy. Precision weapons such as cruise missiles have replaced older munitions such as cluster bombs.

Strike variants have a limited air-to-air capability with AIM-9 Sidewinder or AIM-132 ASRAAM air-to-air missiles (AAMs). The Tornado ADV was outfitted with beyond visual range AAMs such as the Skyflash and AIM-120 AMRAAM missiles. The Tornado is armed with two  Mauser BK-27 revolver cannon internally mounted underneath the fuselage; the Tornado ADV was only armed with one cannon. When the RAF GR1 aircraft were converted to GR4, the FLIR sensor replaced the left hand cannon, leaving only one; the GR1A reconnaissance variant gave up both its guns to make space for the sideways looking infra-red sensors. The Mauser BK-27 was developed specifically for the Tornado, but has since been used on several other European fighters, such as the Dassault/Dornier Alpha Jet, Saab JAS 39 Gripen, and Eurofighter Typhoon.

The Tornado is capable of delivering air-launched nuclear weapons. In 1979, Britain considered replacing its Polaris submarines with either the Trident submarines or the Tornado as the main bearer of its nuclear deterrent. Although the UK proceeded with Trident, several Tornado squadrons based in Germany were assigned to SACEUR to deter a major Soviet offensive with both conventional and nuclear weapons, namely the WE.177 nuclear bomb, which was retired in 1998. German and Italian Tornados are capable of delivering US B61 nuclear bombs, which are made available through NATO.

Engine

Britain considered the selection of Rolls-Royce to develop the advanced engine for the MRCA to be essential, and was strongly opposed to adopting an engine from an American manufacturer, to the point where the UK might have withdrawn over the issue. In September 1969, Rolls-Royce's RB199 engine was selected to power the MRCA. One advantage over the US competition was that a technology transfer between the partner nations had been agreed; the engine was to be developed and manufactured by a joint company, Turbo-Union. The programme was delayed by Rolls-Royce's entry into receivership in 1971. however the nature of the multinational collaboration process helped avoid major disruption of the Tornado programme. Research from the supersonic airliner Concorde contributed to the development and final design of the RB199 and of the engine control units.

To operate efficiently across a wide range of conditions and speeds up to Mach 2, the RB199 and several other engines make use of variable intake ramps to control the air flow. The hydraulic system is pressurised by syphoning power from both or either operational engine; the hydraulics are completely contained within the airframe rather than integrating with the engine to improve safety and maintainability. In case of double-engine, or double-generator, failure, the Tornado has a single-use battery capable of operating the fuel pump and hydraulics for up to 13 minutes.

Relatively rarely among fighter aircraft, the RB199 is fitted with thrust reversers to decrease the distance required to land safely. To fully deploy the thrust reverser during landings, the yaw damper is connected to the steering of the nosewheel to provide greater stability.

In August 1974, the first RB199 powered flight of a prototype Tornado occurred and the engine completed its qualification tests in late 1978. The final production standard engine met both reliability and performance standards, though the development cost had been higher than predicted, in part due to the ambitious performance requirements. At the time of the Tornado's introduction to service, the turbine blades of the engine suffered from a shorter life span than desired, which was rectified by the implementation of design revisions upon early-production engines. Several uprated engines were developed and used on both the majority of Tornado ADVs and Germany's Tornado ECRs. The DECU (Digital Engine Control Unit) is the current engine control unit for RB199 engines superseding the analogue MECU (Main Engine Control Unit) also known as CUE.

Upgrades
Being designed for low-level operations, the Tornado required modification to perform in medium level operations that the RAF adopted in the 1990s. The RAF's GR1 fleet was extensively re-manufactured as Tornado GR4s. Upgrades on Tornado GR4s included a Forward looking infrared, a wide-angle HUD (Head-up display), improved cockpit displays, NVG (Night vision devices) capabilities, new avionics, and a Global Positioning System receiver. The upgrade eased the integration of new weapons and sensors which were purchased in parallel, including the Storm Shadow cruise missile, the Brimstone anti-tank missile, Paveway III laser-guided bombs and the RAPTOR reconnaissance pod. The first flight of a Tornado GR4 was on 4 April 1997. The RAF accepted its first delivery on 31 October 1997 and deliveries were completed in 2003. In 2005, the RSAF opted to have their Tornado IDSs undergo a series of upgrades to become equivalent to the RAF's GR4 configuration. On 21 December 2007 BAE signed a £210m contract for CUSP, the Capability Upgrade Strategy (Pilot). This project would see RAF GR4/4A improved in two phases, starting with the integration of the Paveway IV bomb and a communications upgrade, followed by a new tactical datalink in Phase B.

Beginning in 2000, German IDS and ECR Tornados received the ASSTA 1 (Avionics System Software Tornado in Ada) upgrade. ASSTA 1 involved a replacement weapons computer, new GPS and Laser Inertial navigation systems. The new computer allowed the integration of the HARM III, HARM 0 Block IV/V and Taurus KEPD 350 missiles, the Rafael Litening II laser designator pod and GBU-24 Paveway III laser-guided bombs. The ASSTA 2 upgrade began in 2005, primarily consisting of several new digital avionics systems and a new ECM suite; these upgrades are to be only applied to 85 Tornados (20 ECRs and 65 IDSs), as the Tornado is being replaced in part by the Eurofighter Typhoon. The ASSTA 3 upgrade programme, started in 2008, will introduce support for the laser-targeted Joint Direct Attack Munition along with further software changes.

In January 2016, Bild newspaper stated that the newest upgrade of the ASSTA suite to version 3.1, which includes colour multifunctional LCD screens in place of monochrome CRT displays, is interfering with helmet-mounted night-vision optical displays worn by pilots, rendering German Tornado bombers deployed to Syria useless for night missions. The defence ministry admitted that bright cockpit lights could be a distraction for pilots, and said that the solution will be implemented in a few weeks, but denied the need to fly night missions in Syria.

The (iconic) TV TAB displays are used for route planning, the forward-looking infra-red (FLIR) sensors, targeting pods such as TIALD (Thermal Imaging and Laser Designator) and CLDP (Convertible Laser Designator Pod). The original MRCA TV TAB DU navigation display (part number V22.498.90) has green CRT as picture source. The original price for one CRT display version was €33.852,64. Due to the light environment, the picture tube was pushed to the limit due to the high brightness levels causing wear of the picture tube. An Active Matrix Liquid Crystal Displays (AMLCD) drop fit replacement with a digital screen TV TAB (NSN 5895-99-597-1323) was developed to replace the 'old' wear sensitive CRT versions. The CRT versions are mainly recognisable by the two white domes at the top of the display containing the light sensors for automatic brightness regulation and the white buttons. The newer digital version is mainly recognisable by the black buttons with big white dots on them. The replacement AMLCD version has a color displays instead of the original green monochrome displays. A new feature is that the AMLCD has a bezel that reduces the angle of view. The main goal of the AMLCD upgrade was the intended significant reduction in life cycle costs. But it's said that the newer AMLCD version fail rather quick due to the more sensitive and complex digital electronics compared to the much more simpler design of the original CRT display. The old and newer version are a masterpiece of state of the art engineering and both are very well build. For example there's a diagnose connector at the back panel for quick troubleshooting. The display unit is eventually a rather 'dumb' device. The original display unit is 'just' a display and a keypad. To show a picture, the separated video signal, vertical and horizontal synchronisation signals have to be fed into the display unit since there's no internal electronics for synchronisation separation of the video signal. The additional waveform generator (WFG) is needed to 'create' the desired images for use in the airplane. To power the display unit, a three phase 115VAC 400 Hz including neutral and a 28VDC signal have to be supplied to the display unit. The CRT version has a Low Voltage Power Supply (LVPS) for creating the needed low voltage signals. There's also a High Voltage Power Supply (HVPS) for creating the desired high voltage for the CRT picture tube. Since the newer AMLCD has no CRT picture tube, the high voltages are not needed an the mechanical and electrical design is completely different except for the connections, mounting points and functionality. The newer AMLCD version 'only' needs 28VDC for functionality. But since a drop fit replacement is mandatory, the AMLCD version has a built in three phase 115VAC 400 Hz conversion to 28VDC. By removing the rear three phase conversion power supply plug-in board and applying 28VDC (<4,1A) to the power supply board, the device can be powered for avionics enthusiast use. The AMLCD has a built in menu for selecting the airplane type: GR1, GR4 or F3, a self test and a display test like a grid pattern and color bars shown in the picture.

BAE Systems announced that, in December 2013, it had test-flown a Tornado equipped with parts made with 3D printing equipment. The parts included a protective cover for the radio, a landing-gear guard and air-intake door support struts. The test demonstrated the feasibility of making replacement parts quickly and cheaply at the air base hosting the Tornado. The company claimed that, with some of the parts costing less than £100 to manufacture, 3D printing already resulted in savings of more than £300,000 and would offer further potential cost savings of more than £1.2 million through 2017.

Operational history

German Air Force (Luftwaffe)

The first Tornado prototype made its first flight on 14 August 1974 from Ingolstadt Manching Airport, in West Germany. Deliveries of production Tornados began on 27 July 1979. The total number of Tornados delivered to the German Air Force was 247, including 35 ECR variants. Originally Tornados equipped five fighter-bomber wings (Geschwader), with one tactical conversion unit and four front-line wings, replacing the Lockheed F-104 Starfighter. When one of the two Tornado wings of the German Navy was disbanded in 1994, its aircraft were used to re-equip a Luftwaffe's reconnaissance wing formerly equipped with McDonnell Douglas RF-4E Phantoms.

14 German Tornados undertook combat operations as a part of NATO's campaign during the Bosnian War. The Tornados, operating from Piacenza, Italy, flew reconnaissance missions to survey damage inflicted by previous strikes and to scout new targets. These reconnaissance missions were reportedly responsible for a significant improvement in target selection throughout the campaign.

In 1999, German Tornados participated in Operation Allied Force, NATO airstrikes against the Federal Republic of Yugoslavia during the Kosovo War. This was Germany's first offensive air mission since World War II. The ECR aircraft escorted various allies' aircraft while carrying several AGM-88 HARM missiles to counter attempted use of radar against the allied aircraft. During the Kosovo hostilities, Germany's IDS Tornados routinely conducted reconnaissance flights to identify both enemy ground forces and civilian refugees within Yugoslavia. The German Tornados flew 2108 hours and 446 sorties, firing 236 HARM missiles at hostile targets.

In June 2007, a pair of Luftwaffe Tornados flew reconnaissance missions over an anti-globalisation demonstration during the 33rd G8 summit in Heiligendamm. Following the mission, the German Defence Ministry admitted one aircraft had broken the minimum flying altitude and that mistakes were made in the handling of security of the summit.

In 2007, a detachment of six Tornados of the Aufklärungsgeschwader 51 "Immelmann" (51st reconnaissance wing) were deployed to Mazar-i-Sharif, Northern Afghanistan, to support NATO forces. The decision to send Tornados to Afghanistan was controversial: one political party launched an unsuccessful legal bid to block the deployment as unconstitutional. In support of the Afghanistan mission, improvements in the Tornado's reconnaissance equipment were accelerated; enhancing the Tornado's ability to detect hidden improvised explosive devices (IEDs). The German Tornados were withdrawn from Afghanistan in November 2010.

Defence cuts announced in March 2003 resulted in the decision to retire 90 Tornados from service with the Luftwaffe. This led to a reduction in its Tornado strength to four wings by September 2005. On 13 January 2004, the then German Defence Minister Peter Struck announced further major changes to the German armed forces. A major part of this announcement was the plan to cut the German fighter fleet from 426 in early 2004 to 265 by 2015. The German Tornado force was to be reduced to 85, with the type expected to remain in service with the Luftwaffe until 2025. The aircraft being retained have been undergoing a service life extension programme. Currently, the Luftwaffe operates Tornados with Tactical Wings Taktisches Luftwaffengeschwader 33 in Cochem/Büchel Air Base, Rhineland-Palatinate and with Taktisches Luftwaffengeschwader 51 "Immelmann" in Jagel, Schleswig-Holstein.

German Tornado aircrew training took place at Holloman Air Force Base in New Mexico, US from January 1996 at the Taktische Ausbildungskommando der Luftwaffe USA (TaktAusbKdoLw USA Tactical Training Command of the Luftwaffe USA) which was responsible for training both German F-4 Phantom and Tornado crews. In 1999 the training command was renamed as Fliegerisches Ausbildungszentrum der Luftwaffe (FlgAusbZLw Luftwaffe Training Center).  In March 2015, Defence Minister Ursula von der Leyen decided to continue this training in Germany. In September 2017, flight training in Holloman for the Tornado was discontinued and transferred to Taktischen Luftwaffengeschwader 51 in Jagel with the US location command dissolved in 2019.

In April 2020, it was reported that the German defence ministry planned to replace its Tornado aircraft with a purchase of 30 Boeing F/A-18E/F Super Hornets, 15 EA-18G Growlers, and 55 Eurofighter Typhoons. The Super Hornet was selected due to its compatibility with nuclear weapons and availability of an electronic attack version. In March 2020, the Super Hornet was not certified for the B61 nuclear bombs, but Dan Gillian, head of Boeing's Super Hornet program, previously stated "We certainly think that we, working with the U.S. government, can meet the German requirements there on the [required] timeline."

In 2021, Airbus offered to replace Luftwaffe's 90 ageing Tornado Interdiction and Strike (IDS) and Electronic Combat Reconnaissance (ECR) aircraft with 85 new Eurofighter Tranche 5 standard from 2030. In 2022, the German defence ministry announced that 35 Lockheed Martin F-35 Lightning IIs will replace the Tornado fleet for nuclear sharing instead of the discussed 30 Boeing Super Hornets.

German Navy (Marineflieger)

In addition to the order made by the Luftwaffe, the German Navy's Marineflieger also received 112 of the IDS variant in the anti-shipping and marine reconnaissance roles, again replacing the Starfighter. These Tornados equipped two wings, each with a nominal strength of 48 aircraft. The principal anti-ship weapon was the AS.34 Kormoran anti-ship missile, which were initially supplemented by unguided bombs and BL755 cluster munitions, and later by AGM-88 HARM anti-radar missiles. Pods fitted with panoramic optical cameras and an infrared line scan were carried for the reconnaissance mission.

The end of the Cold War and the signing of the CFE Treaty led Germany to reduce the size of its armed forces, including the number of combat aircraft. To meet this need, one of the Marinefliegers Tornado wings was disbanded on 1 January 1994; its aircraft replaced the Phantoms of a Luftwaffe reconnaissance wing.Lake World Air Power Journal Volume 32, pp. 129, 132. The second wing was enlarged and continued in the anti-shipping, reconnaissance and anti-radar roles until it was disbanded in 2005 with its aircraft and duties passed on to the Luftwaffe.

Italian Air Force (Aeronautica Militare)
The first Italian prototype made its maiden flight on 5 December 1975 from Turin. The Aeronautica Militare received 100 Tornado IDSs (known as the A-200 in Italian service). 16 A-200s were subsequently converted to the ECR configuration; the first Italian Tornado ECR (known as the EA-200) was delivered on 27 February 1998. As a stop-gap measure for 10 years the Aeronautica Militare additionally operated 24 Tornado ADVs in the air defence role, which were leased from the RAF to cover the service gap between the retirement of the Lockheed F-104 Starfighter and the introduction of the Eurofighter Typhoon.

Italian Tornados, along with RAF Tornados, took part in the first Gulf War in 1991. Operation Locusta saw eight Tornado IDS interdictors deployed from Gioia del Colle, Italy, to Al Dhafra, Abu Dhabi, as part of Italy's contribution to the coalition. During the conflict, one aircraft was lost to Iraqi anti-aircraft fire; the pilots ejected safely and were captured by Iraqi forces. A total of 22 Italian Tornados were deployed in the NATO-organised Operation Allied Force over Kosovo in 1999; the A-200s served in the bombing role while the EA-200s patrolled the combat region, acting to suppress enemy anti-aircraft radars, firing 115 AGM-88 HARM missiles.

In 2000, with delays to the Eurofighter, the Aeronautica Militare began a search for another interim fighter. While the Tornado was considered, any long term extension to the lease would have involved upgrade to RAF CSP standard and thus was not considered cost effective. In February 2001, Italy announced its arrangement to lease 35 F-16s from the United States under the PEACE CAESAR programme. The Aeronautica Militare returned its Tornado ADVs to the RAF, with the final aircraft arriving at RAF St Athan on 7 December 2004. One aircraft was retained for static display purposes at the Italian Air Force Museum.

In July 2002, Italy signed a contract with the Tornado Management Agency (NETMA) and Panavia for the upgrading of 18 A-200s, the first of which was received in 2003. The upgrade introduced improved navigation systems (integrated GPS and laser INS) and the ability to carry new weapons, including the Storm Shadow cruise missile, Joint Direct Attack Munition and Paveway III laser-guided bombs.

In response to anticipated violence during the 2010 Afghanistan elections, Italy, along with several other nations, increased its military commitment in Afghanistan, dispatching four A-200 Tornados to the region. Italy has opted to extend the Tornado's service life at the expense of alternative ground-attack aircraft such as the AMX International AMX; in 2010 a major upgrade and life extension programme was initiated, to provide new digital displays, Link 16 communications capability, night-vision goggles compatibility, and several other upgrades. In the long term, it is planned to replace the Tornado IDS/ECR fleet in Italian service with the Lockheed Martin F-35 Lightning II, with the final Italian Tornado scheduled to be phased out in 2025. The Aeronautica Militare received its first of an eventual 15 upgraded Tornado EA-200s on 15 June 2013.

Italian Tornado A-200 and EA-200 aircraft participated in the enforcement of a UN no-fly zone during the 2011 military intervention in Libya. Various coalition aircraft operated from bases in Italy, including RAF Tornados. Italian military aircraft delivered a combined 710 guided bombs and missiles during the strikes against Libyan targets. Of these Aeronautica Militare Tornados and AMX fighter-bombers released 550 guided bombs and missiles, and Italian Navy AV-8Bs delivered 160 guided bombs. Italian Tornados launched 20 to 30 Storm Shadow cruise missiles with the rest consisting of Paveway and JDAM guided bombs.

On 19 August 2014, two Aeronautica Militare Tornados collided in mid-air during a training mission near Ascoli. On 14 November 2014, Italy announced it was sending four Tornado aircraft with 135 support staff to Ahmad al-Jaber Air Base and to 2 other bases in Kuwait in participation of coalition operations against the Islamic State.  The four aircraft will be used for reconnaissance missions only.Italy To Send 4 Tornados for Recon in Iraq - Defensenews.com, 14 November 2014

In October 2018, it was announced that the EA-200 Tornado had successfully completed operational testing of the AGM-88E AARGM, providing capabilities of an "expanded target set, counter-shutdown capability, advanced signals processing for improved detection and locating, geographic specificity, and a weapon impact-assessment broadcast capability."

Royal Air Force

Nicknamed the "Tonka" by the British, their first prototype (XX946) made its maiden flight on 30 October 1974 from BAC Warton. The first full production Tornado GR1 (ZA319) flew on 10 July 1979 from Warton. The first RAF Tornados (ZA320 and ZA322) were delivered to the TTTE at RAF Cottesmore on 1 July 1980. Crew that qualified from the TTTE went onto the Tornado Weapons Conversion Unit (TWCU), which formed on 1 August 1981 at RAF Honington, before being posted to a front-line squadron. No. IX (B) Squadron became the first front-line squadron in the world to operate the Tornado when it reformed on 1 June 1982, having received its first Tornado GR1 ZA586 on 6 January 1982.Napier 2017, p. 20. No. IX (B) Squadron was declared strike combat ready to the Supreme Allied Commander Europe (SACEUR) in January 1983. Two more squadrons were formed at RAF Marham in 1983 – No. 617 Squadron on 1 January and No. 27 Squadron on 12 August. The first RAF Tornado GR1 loss was on 27 September 1983 when ZA586 suffered complete electrical failure and crashed. Navigator Flt. Lt. Nigel Nickles ejected but the pilot Sqn. Ldr. Michael Stephens died in the crash after ordering ejection. In January 1984, the TWCU became No. 45 (Reserve) Squadron.

RAF Germany (RAFG) began receiving Tornados after the formation of No. XV (Designate) Squadron on 1 September 1983 at RAF Laarbruch followed by No. 16 (Designate) Squadron in January 1984 (who were both Blackburn Buccaneer squadrons). They were then joined by No. 20 (Designate) Squadron in May 1984 (who were operating the SEPECAT Jaguar GR1 from RAF Brüggen). Unlike the Tornado squadrons based in the UK which were under control of the British military, those stationed in RAFG were under the control of SACEUR, with the aircraft on Quick Reaction Alert (Nuclear), "QRA (N)", being equipped with the WE.177 nuclear bomb. In the event of the Cold War going 'hot', the majority of RAFG Tornado squadrons were tasked with destroying Warsaw Pact airfields and surface-to-air missile (SAM) sites in East Germany. While No. 20 Squadron was given a separate responsibility of destroying bridges over the rivers Elbe and Weser to prevent Warsaw Pact forces from advancing. By early 1985, Nos. XV, 16 and 20 Squadrons at RAF Laarbruch had been declared strike combat ready to SACEUR.

Tornados began to arrive at RAF Brüggen in September 1984 with the formation of No. 31 (Designate) Squadron. No. 17 (Designate) Squadron was formed in December 1984, with the two Brüggen squadrons joined by No. 14 (Designate) Squadron in mid-1985. No. IX (B) Squadron relocated from RAF Honington to RAF Brüggen on 1 October 1986, arriving in a diamond nine formation. The outcome of the Reykjavík Summit in October 1986 between Ronald Reagan and Mikhail Gorbachev led the end of QRA (Nuclear) for the Tornado force. By the end of 1986, the Tornado GR1 fleet had been equipped with a Laser Ranger and Marked Target Seeker (LRMTS) under the nose, and had begun to be equipped with the BOZ-107 chaff and flare dispenser.

The Tornado made its combat debut as part of Operation Granby, the British contribution to the Gulf War in 1991. This saw 49 RAF Tornado GR1s deploy to Muharraq Airfield in Bahrain and to Tabuk Air Base and Dhahran Airfield in Saudi Arabia. 18 Tornado F3s were deployed to provide air cover, the threat of their long range missiles being a deterrent to Iraqi pilots, who would avoid combat when approached. Early on in the conflict, the GR1s targeted military airfields across Iraq, deploying a mixture of  unguided bombs in loft-bombing attacks and specialised JP233 runway denial weapons. On 17 January 1991, the first Tornado to be lost was shot down by an Iraqi SA-16 missile following a failed low-level bombing run. On 19 January, another RAF Tornado was shot down during an intensive raid on Tallil Air Base. The impact of the Tornado strikes upon Iraqi airfields is difficult to determine.Clark 1993, p. 30. A total of six RAF Tornados were lost in the conflict, four while delivering unguided bombs, one after delivering JP233, and one trying to deliver laser-guided bombs.

The UK sent a detachment of Blackburn Buccaneer aircraft equipped with Westinghouse Electric Corporation Pave Spike laser designators, allowing Tornado GR1s to drop precision guided weapons guided by the Buccaneers. A planned programme to fit GR1s with the GEC-Marconi TIALD laser designation system was rapidly accelerated to give the Tornado force the ability to self-designate targets. Author Claus-Christian Szejnmann declared that the TIALD pod enabled the GR1 to "achieve probably the most accurate bombing in the RAF's history".Szejnmann 2009, p. 217. Although laser designation proved effective in the Gulf War, only 23 TIALD pods had been purchased by 2000; shortages hindered combat operations over Kosovo.

After the war's opening phase, the GR1s switched to medium-level strike missions; typical targets included munition depots and oil refineries. Only the reconnaissance Tornado GR1As continued flying the low-altitude high-speed profile, emerging unscathed despite the inherent danger in conducting pre-attack reconnaissance. After the conflict, Britain maintained a military presence in the Gulf. Around six GR1s were based at Ali Al Salem airbase in Kuwait, contributing the southern no-fly zone as part of Operation Southern Watch. Six additional GR1s participated in Operation Provide Comfort over Northern Iraq.

The upgraded Tornado GR4 made its operational debut in Operation Southern Watch; patrolling Iraq's southern airspace from bases in Kuwait. Both Tornado GR1s and GR4s based at Ali Al Salem, Kuwait, took part in coalition strikes at Iraq's military infrastructure during Operation Desert Fox in 1998. In December 1998, an Iraqi anti-aircraft battery fired six to eight missiles at a patrolling Tornado. The battery was later attacked in retaliation, and no aircraft were lost during the incident. It was reported that during Desert Fox RAF Tornados had successfully destroyed 75% of their targets, and out of the 36 missions planned, 28 had been successfully completed.

The GR1 participated in the Kosovo War in 1999. Tornados initially operated from RAF Brüggen, Germany and later from Solenzara Air Base, Corsica. Experiences from Kosovo led to the RAF procuring AGM-65 Maverick missiles and Enhanced Paveway smart bombs for the Tornado. Following the Kosovo War, the GR1 was phased out as aircraft were upgraded to GR4 standard; the final upgrade was returned to the RAF on 10 June 2003.

The GR4 was used in Operation Telic, Britain's contribution to the 2003 invasion of Iraq. RAF Tornados flew alongside American aircraft in the opening phase of the war, striking Iraqi targets. Aiming to minimise civilian casualties, Tornados deployed the Storm Shadow cruise missile for the first time.  Whilst 25% of the UK's air-launched weapons in Kosovo were precision-guided, four years later in Iraq this ratio increased to 85%.

On 23 March 2003, a Tornado GR4 was shot down over Iraq by friendly fire from a US Patriot missile battery, killing both crew members."RAF Tornado Downed by US Missile." BBC News, 23 March 2003. In July 2003, a US board of inquiry exonerated the battery's operators, observing the Tornado's "lack of functioning IFF (Identification Friend or Foe)" as a factor in the incident. Problems with Patriot were also suggested as a factor, multiple incidents of mis-identification of friendly aircraft have occurred, including the fatal shootdown of a US Navy F/A-18 a few weeks after the Tornado's loss.Leung, Rebecca. "The Patriot Flawed."  CBS News, 5 December 2007. Britain withdrew the last of its Tornados from Iraq in June 2009.

In early 2009, several GR4s arrived at Kandahar Airfield, Afghanistan to replace the British Aerospace Harrier GR7/9 aircraft which had been deployed there since November 2004. In 2009, Paveway IV guided bombs were brought into service on the RAF's Tornados, having been previously used in Afghanistan by the Harrier II. In Summer 2010, extra Tornados were dispatched to Kandahar for the duration of the 2010 Afghan election. British Tornados ended operations in Afghanistan in November 2014, having flown over 5,000 pairs sorties over 33,500 hours, including 600 "shows of force" to deter Taliban attacks. During more than 70 engagements, 140 Brimstone missiles and Paveway IV bombs were deployed, and over 3,000 27 mm cannon shells fired.

Prior to the 2010 Strategic Defence and Security Review (SDSR)'s publication, the Tornado's retirement was under consideration with savings of £7.5 billion anticipated. The SDSR announced the Tornado would be retained at the expense of the Harrier II, although numbers would decline in the transition to the Eurofighter Typhoon and the F-35 Lightning II.Hoyle, Craig. "UK confirms two Tornado GR4 squadrons will go by June." Flight International, 1 March 2011. By July 2013, 59 RAF GR4s were receiving the CUSP avionics upgrade, which achieved Initial Service Date (ISD) in March 2013.

On 18 March 2011, British Prime Minister David Cameron announced that Tornados and Typhoons would enforce a no-fly zone in Libya. In March 2011, several Tornados flew  strike missions against targets inside Libya in what were, according to Defence Secretary Liam Fox, "the longest range bombing mission conducted by the RAF since the Falklands conflict". A variety of munitions were used during Tornado operations over Libya, including laser-guided bombs and Brimstone missiles.

In August 2014, Tornado GR4s were deployed to RAF Akrotiri, Cyprus to support refugees sheltering from Islamic State militants in the Mount Sinjar region of Iraq. The decision came three days after the United States began conducting air attacks against the Islamic State. Tornados were pre-positioned to gather situational awareness in the region. On 27 September 2014, after Parliament approved airstrikes against Islamic State forces inside Iraq, two Tornados conducted their first armed reconnaissance mission in conjunction with coalition aircraft. The next day, two Tornados made the first airstrike on a heavy weapons post and an armoured vehicle, supporting Kurdish forces in northwest Iraq.

By 1 March 2015, eight RAF Tornados had been deployed to Akrotiri and conducted 159 airstrikes against IS targets in Iraq. On 2 December 2015, Parliament approved air strikes in Syria as well as Iraq to combat the growing threat of ISIL; Tornados began bombing that evening. On 14 April 2018, four Tornado GR4s from RAF Akrotiri struck a Syrian military facility with Storm Shadow cruise missiles in response to a suspected chemical attack on Douma by the Syrian regime the previous week.

On 10 July 2018, nine Tornado GR4s from RAF Marham flew over London to celebrate 100 years of the RAF. During late 2018, the RAF commemorated the Tornado's service with three special schemes: ZG752 paid homage to its early years with a green/grey wraparound camouflage; ZG775 and ZD716 both wore schemes commemorating the final units to operate the type – No. IX (B) Squadron and No. 31 Squadron respectively. On 31 January 2019, the Tornado GR4 flew its last operational sorties in Operation Shader. The eight Tornados formerly stationed at RAF Akrotiri returned to RAF Marham in early February 2019, their duties assumed by six Typhoons. Between September 2014 and January 2019, RAF Tornados accounted for 31% of the estimated 4,315 casualties inflicted upon ISIL by the RAF during the operation.

To celebrate 40 years of service and to mark the type's retirement, several flypasts were carried out on 19, 20 and 21 February 2019 over locations such as BAE Warton, RAF Honington and RAF Lossiemouth. On 28 February, nine Tornados flew out of RAF Marham for a diamond nine formation flypast over a graduation parade at RAF Cranwell before returning and carrying out a series of passes over RAF Marham. On 14 March 2019 the final flight of an RAF Tornado was carried out by Tornado GR4 ZA463, the oldest remaining Tornado, over RAF Marham during the disbandment parade of No. IX (B) Squadron and No. 31 Squadron. The Tornado GR4 was officially retired from RAF service on 1 April 2019, the 101st anniversary of the force. Post-retirement, five Tornados returned to RAF Honington via road for the Complex Air Ground Environment (CAGE), which simulates a Tornado flight line for training purposes.

Royal Saudi Air Force

On 25 September 1985, the UK and Saudi Arabia signed the Al Yamamah I contract including the sale of 48 IDS and 24 ADV model Tornados. The first flight of a Royal Saudi Air Force Tornado IDS was on 26 March 1986, and the first Saudi ADV was delivered on 9 February 1989. Saudi Tornados took part in the Gulf War. In June 1993 the Al Yamamah II contract was signed, the main element of which was 48 additional IDSs.Koch and Long 2003, pp. 81–82.

Following experience with both the Tornado and the McDonnell Douglas F-15E Strike Eagle, the RSAF discontinued low-level mission training in the F-15E in light of the Tornado's superior low-altitude flight performance. Ten of the Saudi Tornados were fitted with equipment for performing reconnaissance missions. The 22 Tornado ADVs were replaced by the Eurofighter Typhoon; the retired aircraft were purchased back by the UK.

By 2007, both the Sea Eagle anti-ship missile and the ALARM anti-radiation missile that previously equipped the RSAF's Tornados had been withdrawn from service. As of 2010, Saudi Arabia has signed several contracts for new weapon systems to be fitted to their Tornado and Typhoon fleets, such as the short range air-to-air IRIS-T missile, and the Brimstone and Storm Shadow missiles.

In September 2006, the Saudi government signed a contract worth £2.5 billion (US$4.7 billion) with BAE Systems to upgrade up to 80 RSAF Tornado IDS aircraft to keep them in service until 2020. The first RSAF Tornado was returned to BAE Systems Warton in December 2006 for upgrade under the "Tornado Sustainment Programme" (TSP) to "equip the IDS fleet with a range of new precision-guided weapons and enhanced targeting equipment, in many cases common with those systems already fielded by the UK's Tornado GR4s." In December 2007, the first RSAF aircraft to complete modernisation was returned to Saudi Arabia.

Starting from the first week of November 2009, RSAF Tornados, along with Saudi F-15s performed air raids during the Shia insurgency in north Yemen. It was the first time since Operation Desert Storm in 1991 that the RSAF had participated in a military operation over hostile territory. RSAF Tornados are playing a central role in Saudi-led bombing campaign in Yemen.

On 7 January 2018, Houthi fighters claimed to have shot down a Saudi warplane which was conducting air-raids over northern Yemen. According to Saudi reports, the downed aircraft was an RSAF Tornado which was on a combat mission over Saada province in northern Yemen, it was lost for 'technical reasons' and both crew were rescued.

On 12 July 2018, another RSAF Tornado crashed in Asir region after returning from Saada, Yemen due to a technical malfunction. On 14 February 2020, a Saudi Tornado was shot down during close air support mission in support of Saudi allied Yemeni forces in the Yemeni Al Jouf governorate by Houthis. On the day after, the Saudi command confirmed the loss of a Tornado, while a video was released showing the downing using a two-stage surface to air missile. Both pilots ejected and were captured by Houthis.

Variants

Tornado IDS

Tornado GR1
RAF IDS (interdictor/strike) variants were initially designated the Tornado GR1 with later modified aircraft designated Tornado GR1A, Tornado GR1B, Tornado GR4 and Tornado GR4A. The first of 228 GR1s was delivered on 5 June 1979, and the type entered service in the early 1980s.

Tornado GR1B
The Tornado GR1B was a specialised anti-shipping variant of the GR1, replacing the Blackburn Buccaneer. 26 aircraft were converted and were based at RAF Lossiemouth, Scotland. Each aircraft was equipped to carry up to four Sea Eagle anti-ship missiles. At first the GR1B lacked the radar capability to track shipping, instead relying on the missile's seeker for target acquisition; later updates allowed target data to be passed from aircraft to missile.

Tornado GR1P
A single Tornado GR1 (ZA326, the eighth production aircraft) was re-designated GR1P after being partially rebuilt using parts from different production batches following a fire during engine testing. This aircraft served with the Royal Aircraft Establishment and the Empire Test Pilot's School until 2005, when it was retired, being the last GR1 in service anywhere in the world. 
Tornado GR4
The UK Ministry of Defence began studies for a GR1 Mid-Life Update (MLU) in 1984. The update to GR4 standard, approved in 1994, would improve capability in the medium-altitude role based on lessons learned from the GR1's performance in the 1991 Gulf War. British Aerospace (later BAE Systems) upgraded 142 Tornado GR1s to GR4 standard, beginning in 1996 and finished in 2003. 59 RAF aircraft later received the CUSP avionics package which integrated the Paveway IV bomb and installed a new secure communications module from Cassidian in Phase A, followed by the Tactical Information Exchange (TIE) datalink from General Dynamics in Phase B.

Tornado GR1A/GR4A
The GR1A is the reconnaissance variant operated by the RAF and RSAF, fitted with the TIRRS (Tornado Infra-Red Reconnaissance System), replacing the cannon. The RAF ordered 30 GR1As, 14 as GR1 rebuilds and 16 new aircraft. When the Tornado GR1s were upgraded to become GR4s, GR1A aircraft were upgraded to GR4A standard. The switch from low-level operations to medium/high-level operations means that the internal TIRRS was no longer used. As the GR4A's internal sensors are no longer essential, the RAF's Tactical Reconnaissance Wing operated both GR4A and GR4 aircraft.

 Tornado ECR
Operated by Germany and Italy, the ECR (Electronic Combat / Reconnaissance) is a Tornado variant devoted to Suppression of Enemy Air Defenses (SEAD) missions. It was first delivered on 21 May 1990. The ECR has sensors to detect radar usage and is equipped with anti-radiation AGM-88 HARM missiles. The Luftwaffe's 35 ECRs were delivered new, while Italy received 16 converted IDSs. Italian Tornado ECRs differ from the Luftwaffe aircraft as they lack built-in reconnaissance capability and use RecceLite reconnaissance pods. Only Luftwaffe ECRs are equipped with the RB199 Mk.105 engine, which has a higher thrust rating. The German ECRs do not carry a cannon. The RAF used the IDS version in the SEAD role instead of the ECR and also modified several of its Tornado F.3s to undertake the mission.

Tornado ADV

The Tornado ADV (air defence variant) was an interceptor variant of the Tornado, developed for the RAF (designated Tornado F2 or F3) and also operated by Saudi Arabia and Italy. The ADV had inferior agility to fighters like the McDonnell Douglas F-15 Eagle, but was not intended as a dogfighter, rather as a long-endurance interceptor to counter the threat from Cold War bombers. Although the ADV had 80% parts commonality with the Tornado IDS, the ADV had greater acceleration, improved RB199 Mk.104 engines, a stretched body, greater fuel capacity, the AI.24 Foxhunter radar, and software changes. It had only one cannon to accommodate a retractable inflight refuelling probe."Turbo-Union: The Power for Peace and Freedom."  turbounion.co.uk. Retrieved: 29 November 2011.

Operators

 Luftwaffe: 210 IDS and 35 ECR Tornados delivered. By December 2018, 94 IDS and 28 ECR aircraft remained in service.
 Marineflieger: 112 IDS Tornados delivered, retired in June 2005 with some aircraft being reallocated to the Luftwaffe.

 Aeronautica Militare: 100 IDS A-200 Tornados delivered (18 converted to ECR EA-200s), 24 ADV F3 aircraft later leased from the RAF between 1995 and 2004. By December 2018, 70 A-200 and 5 EA-200 aircraft remained in service.

 Royal Saudi Air Force: 96 IDS and 24 ADV Tornados delivered, ADVs retired in 2006. By December 2018, 81 IDS aircraft remained in service.

Former operator

 Royal Air Force''': 385 IDS GR1 and ADV F2/F3 Tornados delivered, including 230 GR1s (142 later upgraded to GR4s), 18 F2s and 147 F3s (retired in 2011). GR4 was retired on 1 April 2019.

Aircraft on display

Australia
 ZG791 Tornado GR4 on display at Aviation Heritage Museum, Bull Creek, Western Australia.

Austria
 44+66 Tornado IDS on display at Groß-Siegharts, Lower Austria.

Bulgaria
 44+13 Tornado IDS on display at the National Museum of Military History, Sofia.

Estonia
 ZE256 Tornado F3 on display at the Estonian Aviation Museum, Lange.

Germany
 D-9591 Tornado Prototype P.01 on display at Militärhistorisches Museum Flugplatz Berlin-Gatow.
 XX948 Tornado Prototype P.06 on display at Hermeskeil.

 43+55 Tornado IDS on display at Aeronauticum, Nordholz.
 43+70 Tornado IDS on display at Büchel Air Base, Cochem.
 43+86 Tornado IDS (MTU corporate design paint scheme) at MTU Aero Engines, Munich.
 43+96 Tornado IDS on display at Wengerohr, Wittlich.
 44+31 Tornado IDS (Blue Lightning paint scheme) of the 31st Fighter Bomber Wing "Boelcke" at Nörvenich AB.
 44+35 Tornado IDS on display at the Cologne Bonn Airport, Cologne.
 44+56 Tornado IDS on display at Fliegergeschichtliche Museum TG JaboG 34, Memmingen.
 44+68 Tornado IDS on display at the Militärhistorisches Museum Flugplatz Berlin-Gatow.
 44+84 Tornado IDS on display at Fürstenfeldbruck Air Base, Fürstenfeldbruck.
 44+96 Tornado IDS gate guard at Schleswig Air Base in Jagel, near Schleswig.
 44+97 Tornado IDS of the Einsatzgeschwader (Expeditionary Air Wing) Mazar-i-Sharif at the Deutsches Museum Flugwerft Schleissheim, Oberschleißheim.
 45+30 Tornado IDS on display at Aeronauticum, Nordholz.
 45+44 Tornado IDS gate guard at Büchel Air Base, Cochem.

Italy
 MM7001 Pre-production Tornado P.14 on display at Cameri Air Base, Cameri.
 MM7046 Tornado A-200 gate guard at Ghedi Air Base, Brescia.
 MM7080 Tornado A-200 gate guard at Aviano Air Base, Pordenone.
 MM7210 (ex-ZE836) Tornado F3 on display at the Italian Air Force Museum, Vigna di Valle.

Netherlands
 XX947 Tornado Prototype P.03 on display at PS Aero, Baarlo, painted as 98+08 of the German Air Force.

Saudi Arabia
 765 Tornado IDS on display at King Abdul-Aziz Air Base, Dhahran.
 2915 Tornado ADV on display at the Royal Saudi Air Force Museum in Riyadh.

United Kingdom
 XX946 Tornado Prototype P.02 on display at the RAF Museum Cosford, England.
 XZ630 Pre-production Tornado P.12 on display as a GR4 on the parade ground at RAF Halton, Buckinghamshire, England.
 XZ631 Tornado GR4 Prototype P.15 on display at Yorkshire Air Museum, Elvington, England.
 ZA267 Tornado F2T on display at RAF Syerston, Nottinghamshire, England.
 ZA319 Tornado GR1T on display at the Boscombe Down Aviation Collection, Wiltshire, England.
 ZA326 Tornado GR1P on display at South Wales Aviation Museum, Vale of Glamorgan, Wales. This aircraft was used for weapons tests and flight performance tests.
 ZA354 Tornado GR1 on display at Yorkshire Air Museum, Elvington, England.
 ZA357 Tornado GR1 on display at RAF Syerston, Nottinghamshire, England.

 ZA362 Tornado GR1 previously on display at Highland Aviation Museum, Inverness, Scotland until December 2020. Restoration work is currently underway, including replacement of damaged parts.
 ZA398 Tornado GR4A on display at Cornwall Aviation Heritage Centre, Cornwall, England, the sole surviving RAF RECCE A variant.
 ZA399 Tornado GR1 on display in Knutsford, Cheshire, England.
It was fixed to a pedestal and became a monument.
 ZA452 Tornado GR4 on display at Midland Air Museum, Coventry, England.
 ZA457 Tornado GR1B on display at Royal Air Force Museum London, Hendon, England.
 ZA465 Tornado GR1 on display at Imperial War Museum, Duxford, England.
 ZA469 Tornado GR4 on display at Imperial War Museum, Duxford, England.
 ZA475 Tornado GR1 on the gate at RAF Lossiemouth, Scotland.
 ZA556 Tornado GR4 on display at the Defence Academy of the United Kingdom, Shrivenham, England.
 ZA607 Tornado GR4 on the gate at MoD Sealand, Wales.
 ZA614 Tornado GR4 on the gate at RAF Marham, Norfolk, England.
 ZD744 Tornado GR4 on display at Montrose Air Station Heritage Centre, Angus, Scotland.
 ZE204 Tornado F3 on display at the North East Land, Sea and Air Museums, Tyne and Wear, England.
 ZE760 Tornado F3 on the gate at RAF Coningsby, Lincolnshire, England.
 ZE887 Tornado F3 on display at Royal Air Force Museum London, Hendon, England.
 ZE934 Tornado F3 on display at National Museum of Flight, East Fortune, Scotland.
 ZE966 Tornado F3 on display at Tornado Heritage Centre, Hawarden Airport, Wales.
 ZE967 Tornado F3 on the gate at Leuchars Station, Fife, Scotland.
 ZG771 Tornado GR4 on display at Ulster Aviation Society, Lisburn, Northern Ireland.
 ZH552 Tornado F3 on display at RAF Leeming, North Yorkshire, England.

United States
 ZA374 Tornado GR1 on display at the National Museum of the United States Air Force, Wright Patterson AFB, Ohio.
 43+74 Tornado IDS of the German Navy, Marinefliegergeschwader 1 at the Pima Air & Space Museum, Tucson, Arizona.
 43+75 Tornado IDS on display at Holloman Air Force Base, New Mexico.
 45+11 Tornado IDS on display at the New Mexico Museum of Space History, New Mexico.

Specifications (Tornado GR4)

Popular culture

See also

References

Notes

Citations

Bibliography

 Aeroguide 21: Panavia Tornado F Mk 2/Mk 3. Ongar, UK: Linewrights Ltd. 1988. .
 Allen, Calvin H. and W. Lynn Rigsbee. Oman Under Qaboos: From Coup to Constitution, 1970–1996. London: Routledge, 2000. .
 Ball, Desmond J. The Australian Tactical Fighter Force: Prologue and Prospects. Canberra: Australian National University, 1979. .
 Clark, Richard B. Air Power and Desert Storm. Darby, Pennsylvania: DIANE Publishing, 1993. .
 Cordesman, Anthony H. Gulf Military Forces in an Era of Asymmetric Wars, Volume 1. Westport, Connecticut: Greenwood Publishing, 2007. .
 Cordesman, Anthony H. The Iraq War: Strategy, Tactics, and Military Lessons (CSIS Significant Issues Series). Westport, Connecticut: Praeger, 2003. .
 Cox, Sebastian and Peter Gray. Air Power History: Turning Points from Kitty Hawk to Kosovo. London: Routledge, 2002. .
 Donald, David. "Lossimouth Strike Wing". World Air Power Journal, Volume 33, Summer 1998, pp. 104–113. London: Aerospace Publishing. . ISSN 0959-7050.
 Donald, David and Christopher Chant. Air War in The Gulf 1991. Oxford, UK: Osprey Publishing, 2001. .
 Eagles, J.D. "Preparing a Bomber Destroyer: The Panavia Tornado ADV." Putnam Aeronautical Review (Naval Institute Press), Volume 2, 1991, pp. 88–93.
 
 
 Frédriksen, John C. International Warbirds: An Illustrated Guide to World Military Aircraft, 1914–2000. Santa Barbara, California: ABC-CLIO, 2001. .
 Geiss, Juergen and Peter Berndt. Tornados and Further Planning. European Security and Defence, March 2010.
 
 Hoyle, Craig. "World Air Forces Directory". Flight International, 13–19 December 2011. pp. 26–52.
 Jackson, Paul, Kenneth Munson, Lindsay Peacock and John W. R. Taylor, eds. Jane's All The World's Aircraft 1997–98. London: Jane's Information Group, 1998. .
 Jarret, D. N. Cockpit Engineering. Farnham, Surrey, UK: Ashgate Publishing, 2005. .
 
 Jukes, Malcolm. Aircraft Display Systems. Reston, Virginia: American Institute of Aeronautics and Astronautics, 2004. .
 Koch, Christian and David E. Long. Gulf Security in the Twenty-First Century. London: I.B. Tauris, 2003. .
 Lake, Jon. "Aircraft of the RAF: Part 1 – Panavia Tornado". Air International, Vol. 74, No. 4, April 2008, pp. 24–29. ISSN 0306-5634.
 Lake, Jon. Great Book of Bombers. Minneapolis, Minnesota: Zenith Imprint, 2002. .
 Lake, Jon. "Tornado Variant Briefing: Part I: IDS and Recce". World Air Power Journal, Volume 30, Autumn/Fall 1997, pp. 98–121. London: Aerospace Publishing. . ISSN 0959-7050.
 Lake, Jon. "Tornado Variant Briefing: Part III: Tornado Operators". World Air Power Journal, Volume 32, Spring 1998, pp. 118–137. London: Aerospace Publishing. . ISSN 0959-7050.
 Lambeth, Benjamin S. NATO's Air War for Kosovo: A Strategic and Operational Assessment. Santa Monica, California: Rand Corporation, 2001. .
 Laming, Tim. Fight's On: Airborne with the Aggressors. Minneapolis, Minnesota: Zenith Imprint, 1996. .
 Lawrence, Richard R. Mammoth Eyewitness Book of How It Happened Battles: Eyewitness Accounts of History's Greatest Battles, from Thermopyle to the Gulf War. London: Constable & Robinson Ltd, 2002. .
 List, Friedrich. "German Air Arms Review". Air International, Vol. 70, No. 5, May 2006, pp. 50–57. ISSN 0306-5634.
 Lorell, Mark A. Troubled Partnership: A History of US-Japan Collaboration on the FS-X Fighter. Piscataway, New Jersey: Transaction Publishers (Rutgers University), 1996. .
 Lowry, Richard S. The Gulf War Chronicles: A Military History of the First War with Iraq. Bloomington, Indiana: iUniverse, 2008. .
 Martin, Stephen. The Economics of Offsets: Defence Procurement and Countertrade. London: Routledge, 1996. .
 Moir, Ian and Allan Seabridge. Aircraft Systems: Mechanical, Electrical and Avionics Subsystems Integration. New York: John Wiley and Sons, 2011. .
 Napier, Michael. Tornado GR1: An Operational History. Barnsley: Pen & Sword Aviation, 2017 
 Niccoli, Riccardo. "New Capabilities for Italy's Tornados". Air International, Vol. 72, No. 6, pp. 26–29. ISSN 0306-5634.
 Niccoli, Riccardo. "SAM Busters". Air International, Vol. 76, No. 4, pp. 46–51. ISSN 0306-5634.
 Olsen, John Andreas. Global Air Power. Sterling, Virginia: Potomac Books, 2011. .
 "Paris: Biggest Ever". Flight International, Volume 91, Number 3038, 1 June 1967. pp. 893–908.
 Pratt, Roger. Flight Control Systems: Practical Issues in Design and Implementation. London:Institution of Electrical Engineers, 2000. .
 Peters, John E. European Contributions to Operation Allied Air Force: Implications for Transatlantic Cooperation. Washington/Arlington Virginia: Rand Corporation, 2001. .
 Rachow, Volker. "Luftwaffe Tornado MLU". Air International, Vol. 81, No. 6, December 2011, pp. 70–75. ISSN 0306-5634.
 Richardson, Doug. Tornado (Modern Fighting Aircraft, Vol. 10). New York: Prentice Hall Press, 1986. .
 Richardson, Doug. High Tech Warfare. New York: Crescent Books, 1991. .
 Ripley, Tim. Conflict in The Balkans, 1991–2000. Oxford, UK: Osprey Publishing, 2001. .
 Ripley, Tim. "World Air Forces 2003". Flight International, 25 November – 1 December 2003, pp. 27–71.
 The Royal Air Force Handbook: The Definitive MoD Guide. London: Ministry of Defence, via reprint, Conway, 2006. .
 
 
 Spick, Mike and William Green, Gordon Swanborough. Illustrated Anatomy of the World's Fighters. Zenith Imprint, 2001. .
 Szejnmann, Claus-Christian W. Rethinking History, Dictatorship and War: New Approaches and Interpretations. New York: Continuum International Publishing, 2009. .
 Taylor, John W. R. Jane's All The World's Aircraft. London: Jane's, 1975–1976. .
 Taylor, Michael J.H. Flight International World Aircraft & Systems Directory. London: Reed Business Information, 3rd Edition, 2001. .
 Taylor, Michael J.H. Jane's Aviation Review. London: Jane's Information Group, 1987. .
 "V/STOL 1968". Flight International, Volume 93, Number 3089, 23 May 1968. pp. 793–804a.
 Wertheim, Eric. Naval Institute Guide to Combat Fleets of the World: Their Ships, Aircraft, and Systems. Annapolis, Maryland: Naval Institute Press, 2007. .

External links

 Panavia Managing Tornado
 Tornado (BAe) on Fas.org
 Panavia Tornado IDS Attack Bomber on Aerospaceweb.org
 Panavia Tornado on Tornado-data.com
 List of all active German Tornados
 German IDS Tornado 44+97 at the Deutsches Museum subsidiary Flugwerft Oberschleißheim, Germany (DE)
 "MRCA: Six Years After TSR.2" a 1971 Flight article
 "Supremacy – Panavia MRCA" a 1975 advertisement in Flight''

 
1970s British attack aircraft
1970s German attack aircraft
1970s Italian attack aircraft
1970s international attack aircraft
Variable-sweep-wing aircraft
Twinjets
Aircraft first flown in 1974